Vojislava is a South Slavic given name, a feminine form of Vojislav; it consists of two parts: "Voj" - which means "war, warrior", and "slav" - which means "glory, fame".

People

Vojislava Vojinović (fl. 1359), Serbian noblewoman, daughter of Vojvoda Vojin, married Brajko Branivojević
Vojislava Lukić (born 1987), Serbian former professional tennis player
Vojislava Popović, Serbian former figure skater, now coach

Other

5397 Vojislava, an asteroid

Serbian feminine given names